John Timothy Stone (1868–1954) was an American Presbyterian clergyman.

Biography
He was born in Boston and graduated from Amherst College (1891) and from Auburn Theological Seminary (1894). He was pastor of churches at Utica and Cortland, New York, until 1900; then of the Brown Memorial Presbyterian Church, Baltimore, until 1909; and in that year became pastor of the Fourth Presbyterian Church, Chicago. In 1913–14 he was moderator of the 125th general assembly of the Presbyterian church.

Writings
 Footsteps in a Parish (1908)
 Recruiting for Christ (1910)
 Everyday Religion (1927)
 ''A Prayer to Begin the Day (1928)
He also wrote monographs on educational and religious subjects.

References
 
 

1868 births
1954 deaths
Amherst College alumni
Presbyterian Church in the United States of America ministers
Clergy from Boston
People from Utica, New York
People from Cortland, New York